Joseph Jules Beecken (1904 – 5 February 1948) was a Belgian middleweight boxer who competed in the 1920s.

He won the bronze medal in boxing at the 1924 Summer Olympics in the middleweight category, losing against John Elliott in the semi-final. He won the bronze medal bout against Leslie Black.

Beecken was born in 1904, although conflicting sources indicate his birthdate as either 11 April or 7 May.

References

External links
profile
Profile on databaseOlympics

1904 births
1948 deaths
Middleweight boxers
Olympic boxers of Belgium
Boxers at the 1924 Summer Olympics
Olympic bronze medalists for Belgium
Place of birth missing
Olympic medalists in boxing
Belgian male boxers
Medalists at the 1924 Summer Olympics